Jaakko Piirainen (19 July 1871 – 12 July 1917) was a Finnish master carpenter and politician, born in Kuhmoniemi. He served as a Member of the Parliament of Finland from 1908 to 1909, representing the Social Democratic Party of Finland (SDP).

References

1871 births
1917 deaths
People from Kuhmo
People from Oulu Province (Grand Duchy of Finland)
Social Democratic Party of Finland politicians
Members of the Parliament of Finland (1908–09)